TNA Knockout Music LLC was an American record label operated by Total Nonstop Action Wrestling (TNA), primarily as a platform to release the entrance themes of the promotion's wrestling personalities. It was formed in September 2006, roughly four years following the formation of the TNA promotion in May 2002. Following a restructuring period, TNA Knockout Music legally ceased trading in August 2016, and the promotion would instead release its music independently through distributor TuneCore.

Prior to formation of the record label, Dale Oliver was already TNA's official Head Music Composer and Director of Audio Production. As well as Oliver, Serg Salinas, who is the husband of former TNA owner Dixie Carter, also performed alongside Oliver on select few tracks. Montgomery Gentry and Jeff Hardy have also produced songs alongside Oliver and Salinas, most notably Bobby Roode, James Storm, Matt Hardy, Jeff Hardy and The Latin American Xchange.

History
In May 2002, the professional wrestling federation Total Nonstop Action Wrestling (TNA) was founded by Jeff and Jerry Jarrett. Dale Oliver was hired in the same year as TNA's inception to be its Head Music Composer and Director of Audio Production. Dale's work with the company is mainly writing and producing theme music for the company's various wrestling personalities, programming and live events.

In 2006, TNA Knockout Music LLC. was filed on September 21 to serve as the record label for TNA Entertainment LLC, the parent company of TNA Wrestling.

On August 6, 2016, TNA Knockout Music LLC, alongside TNA Entertainment LLC., were both collapsed as the company began to trade as Impact Ventures LLC., following a restructuring with Billy Corgan becoming president, and former TNA president Dixie Carter becoming chairwoman.

Following the collapse of TNA Knockout Music, TNA would continue to release music independently as Impact Wrestling Music through TuneCore.

In early 2017, TNA Wrestling/Impact Ventures was renamed to Impact Wrestling/Anthem Wrestling Exhibitions by Anthem Sports & Entertainment, who purchased the company following Corgan's leave.

Album releases

Compilation albums

Single-artist albums

Single releases

See also

List of Impact Wrestling albums
Music in professional wrestling
List of record labels

References

External links

American record labels
Impact Wrestling
Professional wrestling music